David Saunders (born May 20, 1966) is a Canadian retired professional ice hockey left winger.

Career 
Saunders was drafted 52nd overall by the Vancouver Canucks in the 1984 NHL Entry Draft and played 56 games for the Canucks during the 1987–88 NHL season, scoring seven goals and 13 assists for 20 points. He also played in the American Hockey League for the Fredericton Express and the International Hockey League for the Flint Spirits and the Milwaukee Admirals before finishing his career in Finland with Vaasan Sport of the I-Divisioona.

Career statistics

Regular season and playoffs

External links 

1966 births
Living people
Canadian expatriate ice hockey players in Finland
Canadian ice hockey left wingers
Flint Spirits players
Fredericton Express players
Ice hockey people from Ottawa
Milwaukee Admirals (IHL) players
St. Lawrence Saints men's ice hockey players
Vaasan Sport players
Vancouver Canucks draft picks
Vancouver Canucks players